is a town located in Kumage District, Kagoshima, Japan. The town is on the island of Yakushima and Kuchinoerabujima.

History
On October 1, 2007, the town was formed by the merger of the towns of Kamiyaku and Yaku, both from Kumage District.

Geography
Major settlements of the island are the port towns of Anbo and Miyanoura. Other settlements are the coastal villages of Hiranai, Kuriobashi, Nagata, Okonotaki and the abandoned forest village of Kosugidani. Among the localities, there are the gorges of Shiratani Unsui, Arakawa, Yakushima Airport, Kigensugi and Yakusugi.

Demographics
As of 2008, the town has an estimated population of 13,486 and the density of 24.9 persons per km2. The total area is 540.98 km2.

Transport

Yakushima Airport serves Yakushima. There are also hydrofoils and ferries serving the island. Kuchinoerabujima is accessible by a municipal ferry. Inside the island there is a forest railway, the Anbo Forest Railway.

Education
High schools
Kagoshima Prefectural Yakushima High School
Yakushima Ōzora High School (correspondence course high school)
 Junior high schools
Anbō Junior High School
Gakunan Junior High School
Issō Junior High School
Kanadake Junior High School
Koseda Junior High School
Miyaura Junior High School
Nagata Junior High School
Elementary schools
Anbō Elementary School
Hachiman Elementary School
Issō Elementary School
Kamiyama Elementary School
Kanadake Elementary School
Koseda Elementary School
Kurio Elementary School
Miyaura Elementary School
Nagata Elementary School

Climate

References

External links

 Yakushima official website 

Towns in Kagoshima Prefecture